Jamie Mathiou (born 4 September 1972) is a former professional rugby league footballer who played in the 1990s and 2000s. An Ireland international , he played for the North Sydney Bears, North Queensland Cowboys and Leeds Rhinos.

Background
Born on the Gold Coast, Queensland, Mathiou played his junior rugby league for the Cudgen Hornets and attended Kingscliff High School, where he represented the Australian Schoolboys in 1989.

Playing career
In 1989, while playing for Cudgen, Mathiou represented the New South Wales under-17 team in their 16–8 win over Queensland under-17. In 1990, he joined the Gold Coast Seagulls, playing for their lower grade sides.

In 1992, Mathiou joined the North Sydney Bears. In Round 18 of the 1992 NSWRL season, he made his first-grade debut in the Bears' 12–26 loss to the St George Dragons. Over two seasons with North Sydney, Mathiou played four games.

In 1995, he joined the newly-established North Queensland Cowboys. He played seven games for the club in their first season. In 1996, he played just four games before departing the club at the end of the season.

In 1997, Mathiou joined the Leeds Rhinos, where he would go on to play 136 games for the club, starting 100 from the bench. He became the longest-serving import for the club since the change of import rules in 1982. In 1998, he came off the bench in Leeds' 1998 Grand Final loss to the Wigan Warriors. In 1999, he came off the bench in Leeds' Challenge Cup win over the London Broncos.

In 2000, he represented Ireland at the 2000 Rugby League World Cup.

In 2002, after leaving Leeds, Mathiou returned to Australia, captaining the Ipswich Jets in the Queensland Cup for two seasons.

Statistics

NSWRL/ARL

Super League

International

Post-playing career
After retiring, Mathiou spent time coaching the Cudgen Hornets and worked as a recruitment coordinator for the Sydney Roosters from 2005 to 2014. In 2015, he joined the Gold Coast Titans as the recruitment manager, spending only a year at the club. In 2016, he returned to the Roosters as a member of the recruitment team.

References

External links
Profile at leedsrugby
SL Stats

1972 births
Living people
Australian rugby league players
Ipswich Jets players
Ireland national rugby league team players
Leeds Rhinos players
North Queensland Cowboys players
North Sydney Bears players
Rugby league players from Gold Coast, Queensland
Rugby league props